Pterostylis actites, commonly known as the coastal short-eared snail orchid, is a species of greenhood orchid endemic to south-western Australia.

Description 
Flowering occurs from July to September.

Distribution and habitat 
Pterostylis actites is restricted to south-western Western Australia, occurring along the coast between Perth and Israelite Bay. It is common within this range, which includes a number of reserves and national parks. It can often be found within metres of the beach, growing on stabilised coastal dunes and in near-coastal heath and woodlands.

Taxonomy and naming 
Diplodium actites was first formally described in 2019 by David L. Jones and Christopher J. French based on a type specimen collected in 2000 from Nornalup, Western Australia. The specific epithet was derived from the Greek word aktites, meaning 'shore dweller', as this species was noted for growing close to the sea. In 2020, Jones and French transferred the species to the genus Pterostylis as P. actites in a later edition of Australian Orchid Review. Texts published before 2019 often used a variation of the name Pterostylis sp. Coastal clubbed sepals to refer to this species, alluding to its coastal distribution and thick lateral sepals.

Conservation status 
Pterostylis actites is listed as 'not threatened' by the Government of Western Australia Department of Biodiversity, Conservation and Attractions.

References 

actites
Orchids of Australia
Orchids of Western Australia
Plants described in 2019
Taxa named by David L. Jones (botanist)